The 1972 Pau Grand Prix was a Formula Two motor race held on 5 May 1972 at the Pau circuit, in Pau, Pyrénées-Atlantiques, France. The Grand Prix was won by Peter Gethin, driving the Chevron B20. Patrick Depailler finished second and David Purley third.

Classification

Race

References

Pau Grand Prix
1972 in French motorsport